Jane Gladstone (born 1968/1969) is the president of IntraFi Network (formerly Promontory Interfinancial Network) and a member of its board of directors. She previously was a senior managing director at Evercore Partners for 15 years. Gladstone started the financial institutions group at Evercore in 2005, and has advised on about $150 billion of M&A and capital raising.

Gladstone grew up in New York and Los Angeles, before studying for a degree in art history from the University of Virginia.

Gladstone worked for Morgan Stanley until 2005.

In 2015, she was included for the first time in Bloomberg Markets list of the 50 Most Influential, those with "the ability to move markets or shape ideas and policies." In 2015, she was ranked at #2 in the Institutional Investor Fintech Finance 35.

References

1960s births
Living people
American bankers